The 2018 World Wrestling Championships were the 15th edition of World Wrestling Championships of combined events and were held from 20 to 28 October in Budapest, Hungary.

Russia claimed 10 gold medals, 1 silver medal and 2 bronze medals, its best ever overall result in the post-Soviet era. In Greco-Roman Wrestling Russian athletes showed the best ever result since 1990.

Medal table

Team ranking

Medal summary

Men's freestyle

Men's Greco-Roman

Women's freestyle

Participating nations
785 competitors from 88 nations participated.

 (4)
 (2)
 (1)
 (2)
 (14)
 (1)
 (10)
 (28)
 (1)
 (28)
 (2)
 (6)
 (17)
 (1)
 (2)
 (20)
 (1)
 (28)
 (6)
 (8)
 (4)
 (12)
 (7)
 (2)
 (2)
 (5)
 (3)
 (6)
 (9)
 (20) 
 (18)
 (4)
 (4)
 (2)
 (1)
 (1)
 (30)
 (30)
 (20)
 (4)
 (4)
 (8)
 (2)
 (30)
 (2)
 (29)
 (11)
 (3)
 (1)
 (1)
 (9)
 (2)
 (2)
 (13)
 (20)
 (4)
 (1)
 (2)
 (1)
 (4)
 (6)
 (4)
 (3)
 (1)
 (1)
 (3)
 (19)
 (5)
 (11)
 (30)
 (2)
 (8)
 (5)
 (1)
 (29)
 (3)
 (2)
 (9)
 (1)
 (1)
 (1)
 (30)
 (4)
 (30)
 (30)
 (17)
 (8)
 (6)

References 

Results Book

External links 
 Official website

 
World Wrestling Championships
World Wrestling Championships
World Wrestling Championships
International wrestling competitions hosted by Hungary
International sports competitions in Budapest
World Wrestling Championships